Mount Gough is a peak on Hong Kong Island, Hong Kong. It is named for Hugh Gough, 1st Viscount Gough, Commander-in-Chief of British Forces in China. The summit is now occupied by a housing complex so is inaccessible to the general public.

See also
List of mountains, peaks and hills in Hong Kong
Victoria Peak
Mount Cameron

References

Victoria Peak
Gough